Posidonia oceanica, commonly known as Neptune grass or Mediterranean tapeweed, is a seagrass species that is endemic to the Mediterranean Sea. It forms large underwater meadows that are an important part of the ecosystem. The fruit is free floating and known in Italy as "the olive of the sea" (l'oliva di mare). Balls of fibrous material from its foliage, known as egagropili or Neptune balls, wash up to nearby shorelines.

The Posidonia has a very high carbon absorption capacity, being able to soak up 15 times more carbon dioxide every year than a similar sized piece of the Amazon rainforest.

Morphology 
Posidonia oceanica has roots (which mainly serve to anchor the plant to the substrate), rhizome and tapeform leaves.

The rhizomes, up to 1 cm thick, grow both horizontally (plagiotropic rhizomes), and vertically (orthotropic rhizomes). The former, thanks to the presence at the bottom of lignited roots up to 15 cm long, anchor the plant to the substrate. The latter, which increase height, have the function of combatting sanding due to continuous sedimentation. The two types of growth give rise to the so-called "kill", a terrace formation that consists of a network of strata of rhizomes, roots and trapped sediments. In this way, posidonias colonise an environment that algae could hardly occupy due to the lack of roots.

The leaves arise from orthotropic rhizomes, are cyntiform and bright green in colour that turns brown over time. They can reach a length of approximately 1.5 metres high. On average they have a width of 1 cm and have 13 to 17 parallel ribs. The apexes are rounded and are often lost by the action of waves and currents.

They are organised in bushes of 6 or 7 leaves, being the oldest on the outside and the youngest on the inside. The leaves are divided into three categories:

 Adult leaves, which have a lamina with photosynthetic function and a base separated from the foliar edge by a concave structure called "ligula";
 Intermediate leaves, which have no basis;
 Young leaves, which normally have a length of less than 50 mm.  In autumn the plant loses the outermost adult leaves, which become brown and are photosynthetically inactive. During the winter, new leaves are produced.

Reproduction 
Posidonia oceanica reproduces both sexually and asexually (by stolons).

Sexual reproduction occurs through the production of flowers and fruits. The flowers are hermaphrodite and are grouped in a herringbone-shaped inflorescence, green in colour and contained between floral bracts. The peduncle binds to the rhizome in the centre of the bunch. The gynaecium is formed by a unilocular ovary that continues with a style and ends in the stigma. The androecium consists of three stamens with short anthers. Flowering depends on environmental factors (light and temperature) and endogenous factors (age and size of the plant) and takes place in September and October in the meadows closest to the sea surface, while in the deepest ones it is postponed for two months. Pollen inside the anthers is spherical in shape, but becomes filamentous as soon as it is released into the water. There are no recognition mechanisms between pollen and stigma that prevent self-fertilisation. Pollination is hydrophilic and can lead to fruit formation, although some of them do not reach maturation, which occurs after six months. Once ripe, the fruits separate and float on the surface.

The fruit, slightly fleshy and called in some places "sea oiva", is similar to a drupe and has a porous pericarp and rich in an oily substance that allows flotation. When it rots, it releases a seed (coated by a thin membrane, but without a true and proper tegument),5 which falls to the bottom and, if it finds the right conditions of depth, stability and type of sediment, germinates and gives rise to a new plant. In order for it to be consolidated, it is necessary that you find a moisturised substrate. Humidification consists of the degradation of plant remains, so the plant can be implanted in "soils" previously colonised by other plants, such as macroalgae or other phanerogams. Thus, a true ecological succession is generated in which posidonia represents the last stage. Germination begins with the release of a small white root of radical pole and a leaf of the apical pole. With sexual reproduction, the plant colonises new areas, diffuses meadows in other areas and guarantees genetic variability.

Asexual reproduction by stolons, which allows the expansion of meadows, is carried out through plagiargiotropic rhizomes, which grow about 7 cm a year and colonise new spaces. The high accumulation of sediments and the reduction of the space available for horizontal growth stimulates the vertical growth of the rhizomes, thus forming the bushes.

Taxonomy
The genus Posidonia  is named after Poseidon, the Greek god of the seas, while oceanica refers to its former wide distribution. Carl Linnaeus gave the first botanical description of this species in Systema Naturae, although the genus was then named Zostera. The APG system (1998) and APG II system (2003) accept the genus as constituting the sole genus in the family Posidoniaceae, which it places in the order Alismatales, in the clade monocots. The Angiosperm Phylogeny Website concludes that the three families Cymodoceaceae, Posidoniaceae and Ruppiaceae form a monophyletic group. Earlier systems classified this genus in the family Potamogetonaceae or in the family Posidoniaceae but belonging to order Zosterales. It was published in: A. R. Delile, Description de l'Égypte, in 1813.

Description

Posidonia oceanica is a flowering plant which lives in dense meadows or along channels in the sands of the Mediterranean. Subsurface rhizomes and roots stabilize the plant while erect rhizomes and leaves reduce silt accumulation.

The leaves are bright green, perhaps turning brown with age, and have 13 to 17 parallel veins. The leaf terminus is rounded or sometimes absent because of damage. Leaves are arranged in groups, with older leaves on the outside, longer and differing in form from the younger leaves they surround.

The rhizome type stems are found in two forms: one growing up to  beneath the sand and the other rising above the sand. This arrangement of the rhizomes eventually forms a mat; the surface contains the active parts of the plant, whereas the center is a dense network of roots and decomposing stems.

The flowering plant's common name is Neptune grass.

In 2006 a huge clonal colony of P. oceanica was discovered south of the island of Ibiza and stretches as far south as La Savina and Es Pujols on the island of Formentera.

Dead rhizomes with olive-mill waste are used for compost.

Distribution and habitat

This species is found only in the Mediterranean Sea, where it is in decline, occupying an area of about 3% of the basin. Posidonia grows best in clean waters, and its presence is a marker for lack of pollution. The presence of Posidonia can be detected by the masses of decomposing leaves on beaches. Such plant material has been used for composting, but Italian laws prohibit the use of marine algae and plants for this purpose.

However, the meadows are being threatened by rising temperatures, which slows down its growth, as well as damage from anchors.

Communities associated with Posidonia oceánica 
The characteristics of the Posidonia plant, its growth dynamics and the large amount of biomass produced, are factors that can sustain very diverse plant and animal communities. Distinguished are: epiphytic communities (that is, bacteria, algae and bryozoa that colonise the surface of the leaves and rhizomes of the plant), vagile and sessile animal communities and communities of detritivorous organisms.

Epiphytic communities 
Along the leaf, successions and neighbourhoods that follow the age of the leaf can be identified. Diatoms and bacteria are implanted near the base of the leaf and on the young leaves. Subsequently, in the central part, red and brown fouling algae are implanted, while above the incrustants and in the apical area live erect filamentous algae.

Epiphytic communities are consumed by gastropod molluscs, amphipod crustaceans and polychaetes, and play a very important role in the food chain of Posidonia meadows, taking into account the fact that few organisms are able to feed directly from the plant tissue, little appetising for herbivores due to the high percentage Epiphytes, however, can also damage the plant. In fact, by increasing weight, they can cause premature fall of the leaves, decrease light and also hinder gas exchanges and the absorption of nutrients through the leaves.

Posidonia oceanica as a bioindicator 
Posidonia has been used for about twenty years as a biological indicator. In fact, the plant has all the characteristics of a good bioindicator:

Isolated matine of Posidonia oceanica. The analysis of the density of the bushes is one of the methods of studying meadows.

 It's a benthic species;
 Has a long life cycle;
 Is widespread throughout the Mediterranean;
 Has a high capacity to concentrate polluting substances in its tissues;
 Is very sensitive to environmental changes.

Therefore, through the study of meadows it is possible to know quite reliably the environmental quality of coastal marine waters.

Generally, the methods of studying Posidonia meadows are four:

 Analysis and monitoring of the lower limit;
 Analysis of the density of grasslands;
 Phenological analysis;
 Lepidochronological analysis.

Lower limit analysis 
There is a close relationship between the depth of the lower limit and the transparency of water.

Density of the foliar fascicles 
As for density, it depends on the depth at which the meadow is located, the luminous intensity and the type of substrate. According to the density of the foliar fascicles, measured in number of bushes / m2, meadows are divided into 5 classes.

 Meadows in equilibrium: density is normal or exceptional;
 Altered meadows: the density is low;
 Greatly altered meadows: the density is abnormal.

Phenological analyses 
Phenological analyses allow to study different useful parameters to describe the state of health of plants:

 Average number of leaves by age (adult, intermediate, young), by foliar fascicle.
 Length and average width of the leaves by age and foliar fascicle.
 Percentage of brown tissue: represents the % of adult leaves that have non photosynthesising tissue.
 LAI Index (Leaf Area Index): measures the leaf surface per m2 of meadow.
 Coefficient "A": percentage of leaves that have lost their apex.

Lepidochronological analyses 
Lepidochronological analysis consists of the study of the life cycles of P. oceanica leaves, which at the time of their separation, once dead, leave the basal part on the rhizome of the plant. These residues, which over time become splinters, have variable thicknesses with annual cyclical trends, useful for the study of environmental variables. Their objectives can be summarised as follows:

 Estimate the biomass produced per year, both in terms of elongation of the rhizomes, and in leaf production.
 Estimate the production of flowers and, therefore, estimate information on the number of sexual reproduction phenomena produced over the years.
 Measure the concentration of heavy metals in the fabrics of the plant.

Secondary metabolites 
To date 51 natural products have been reported from P. oceanica, including natural phenols, phenylmethane derivatives, phenylethane derivatives, phenylpropane derivatives and their esters, chalkones, flavonols, 5-alpha-cholestanes, and cholest-5-enes. Many of the compounds reported for P. oceanica were, however, not detected by appropriate phytochemical methods and some most probably represent artifacts and are not genuine natural products of P. oceanica.

Others

The erosion the Mediterranean Coast 
Posidonia oceanica has similar characteristics to terrestrial plants, such as roots, rhizomatous stem and cintiform leaves up to one metre long arranged in clumps of 6 to 7. It flowers in autumn and produces floating fruits in spring, commonly known as sea olives.

It forms underwater meadows of considerable ecological importance. It constitutes the climax community of the Mediterranean Sea and plays an important role in protecting the coastline from erosion. It is home to many animal and plant organisms that find food and protection in the meadows. It is considered a good.

Functions 
- They fix  and produce oxygen.

- They protect the sandy coastline against erosion.

- They are a reserve of biodiversity due to the large number of animal and plant species that find within the habitat a place for feeding, protection and nursery for juveniles.

- They produce a large part of the sediment that forms part of the sand on our beaches.

See also 
List of long-living organisms
Largest organisms

References

External links

 Posidonia  oceanica – MondoMarino.net
Ibiza's Monster Marine Plant. Ibiza Spotlight, 28 May 2006.
Project LIFE SEPOSSO LIFE SEPOSSO – Supporting Environmental governance for the POSidonia oceanica Sustainable transplanting Operations.

oceanica
Biota of the Adriatic Sea
Biota of the Mediterranean Sea
Flora of Malta